Baxter Glacier is a glacier nurtured by icefalls from Flight Deck Neve, flowing northeast between Flagship Mountain and Mount Davidson to enter Fry Glacier, in Convoy Range, Victoria Land. It was named by a 1976–77 Victoria University of Wellington Antarctic Expedition (VUWAE) field party after James K. Baxter, New Zealand poet and social critic.

See also
 List of glaciers in the Antarctic
 Glaciology

References
 

Glaciers of Scott Coast